The 2010 Bord Gáis Energy GAA Hurling All-Ireland Under-21 Championship was the 47th staging of Ireland's hurling knock-out competition for players aged between 18 and 21. The final was held at Semple Stadium, Thurles on 11 September 2010. Tipperary won the game by 5-22 to 0-12 against Galway to claim their ninth title.

The Championship

Overview
The All-Ireland Under-21 Hurling Championship of 2010 will be run on a provincial basis as usual.  It will be a knockout tournament with pairings drawn at random in the respective provinces - there will be no seeds.

Each match will be played as a single leg. If a match is drawn a period of extra time will be played, however, if both sides were still level at the end of extra time a replay will take place.

Participating counties

Format

Leinster Championship

Quarter-finals: (2 matches) These are two lone matches between the first four teams drawn from the province of Leinster.  Two teams are eliminated at this stage while the two winners advance to the semi-finals.

Semi-finals: (2 matches) The two winners of the two quarter-final games join the two remaining Leinster teams, who received a bye to this stage, to make up the semi-final pairings.  Two teams are eliminated at this stage while the two winners advance to the final.

Final: (1 match) The winners of the two semi-finals contest this game.  One team is eliminated at this stage while the winners advance to the All-Ireland semi-final.

Munster Championship

Quarter-final: (1 match) This is a single match between the first two teams drawn from the province of Munster.  One team is eliminated at this stage while the winners advance to the semi-finals.

Semi-finals: (2 matches) The winners of the lone quarter-final game join the three remaining Munster teams, who received a bye to this stage, to make up the semi-final pairings.  Two teams are eliminated at this stage while the two winners advance to the final.

Final: (1 match) The winners of the two semi-finals contest this game.  One team is eliminated at this stage while the winners advance to the All-Ireland semi-final.

Ulster Championship

Quarter-final: (1 match) This is a single match between the first two teams drawn from the province of Ulster.  One team is eliminated at this stage while the winners advance to the semi-finals.

Semi-finals: (2 matches) The winners of the lone quarter-final game join the three remaining Ulster teams, who received a bye to this stage, to make up the semi-final pairings.  Two teams are eliminated at this stage while the two winners advance to the final.

Final: (1 match) The winners of the two semi-finals contest this game.  One team is eliminated at this stage while the winners advance to the All-Ireland semi-final.

Results

Leinster Under-21 Hurling Championship

Quarter-finals

Semi-finals

Final

Munster Under-21 Hurling Championship

Quarter-final

Semi-finals

Final

Ulster Under-21 Hurling Championship

Quarter-final

Semi-finals

Final

All-Ireland Under-21 Hurling Championship

Semi-finals

Final

Championship statistics

Scoring

Widest winning margin: 29 points
Kilkenny 2-31 : 0-8 Offaly (Leinster quarter-final)
Most goals in a match: 5
Tipperary 5-22 : 0-12 Galway (All-Ireland final)
Most points in a match: 39
Kilkenny 2-31 : 0-8 Offaly (Leinster quarter-final)
Tipperary 1-22 : 1-17 Clare (Munster final)

Top scorers

Top scorers overall

Top scorers in a single game

References

External links
 Full list of results for the 2010 championship

Under-21
All-Ireland Under-21 Hurling Championship